Mauro Emanuel Icardi  (born 19 February 1993) is an Argentine professional footballer who plays as a striker for Süper Lig club Galatasaray, on loan from Ligue 1 club Paris Saint-Germain.

Icardi began his footballing career at the youth teams of Vecindario and passed through La Masia, the youth system of La Liga club Barcelona, before moving to Serie A club Sampdoria to begin his professional career in 2012. After an impressive season, he joined Inter Milan in July 2013, where he developed into one of the most prolific strikers in Europe. Icardi won the Capocannoniere in both the 2014–15 and 2017–18 seasons, and was named the captain of Inter in 2015, at age 22. Three years later, Icardi was integral for Inter reaching a place in the UEFA Champions League, their first time in six years, as he became the club's eighth-highest goalscorer of all time. In 2019, Icardi signed for Paris Saint-Germain on an initial one-year loan deal, where he won a domestic treble. He then joined the club permanently in a €50 million deal.

Icardi made his senior debut for Argentina in October 2013 but since has played sparingly. He was controversially left out of Argentina's final squad for the 2018 FIFA World Cup. This has been often accredited to his marriage to Wanda Nara, whose ex-husband is Icardi's former Sampdoria teammate Maxi López. López and Nara divorced because of her exposed relationship with Icardi.

Club career

Early career
Icardi was born in Rosario, Argentina and moved to Canary Islands when he was nine. He began his football career with Vecindario in Gran Canaria, and scored over 50 goals in their youth categories.

In 2007, he was disputed over by Barcelona and Real Madrid, after offers from Valencia, Sevilla, Espanyol, Deportivo La Coruña, Arsenal and Liverpool. Barcelona won the race for Icardi, and signed with him until 2013.

Icardi joined the Catalan club at the start of 2008–09 season and was included on the U-17 team. He was promoted to the U-19 team the following season before joining Sampdoria on loan in January 2011. Icardi later stated that leaving Barcelona was not a bad decision, convinced that his decision to move on was the right one.

Sampdoria

On 11 January 2011, Sampdoria confirmed Icardi had signed with the club on loan until the end of the season. After a successful six-month loan for la Samp, scoring 13 goals in 19 games with the Primavera team, the Italian side utilised the option to buy Icardi for €400,000 in July 2011, signing a three-year deal. In 2011–12 season, he scored 19 goals in the reserve league Group A, as the joint-third topscorer of the league along with Gonzalo Barreto of Group C.

On 12 May 2012, he made his first-team debut, against Juve Stabia, after coming off the bench to replace Bruno Fornaroli in the 75th minute of the match. Ten minutes later, Icardi scored his first professional goal to win the match 2–1 for Sampdoria.

On 26 September 2012, he made his Serie A debut for Sampdoria against Roma, substituting the Paraguayan midfielder Marcelo Estigarribia in the 49th minute. On 12 November, Icardi scored his first goal in Serie A in the Derby della Lanterna against Genoa in an eventual 3–1 win. On 6 January 2013, he scored two goals against Juventus in Sampdoria's 2–1 upset at Juventus Stadium. It was Juventus's second ever loss in the Juventus Stadium since the construction.

On 27 January 2013, he scored four goals in a six-goal thrashing of fellow strugglers Pescara, lifting the Genoese side clear of the Serie A relegation zone. On 18 May, during the final match of 2012–13 season, Icardi scored again against Juventus, helping the team to beat the eventual champions of Italy 3–2 at Stadio Luigi Ferraris.

Inter Milan

In late April, it was announced that Icardi would join Inter Milan before the beginning of the 2013–14 season. The deal was also later confirmed by Sampdoria board. The transfer fee was €6.5 million for 50% registration rights. Icardi was officially unveiled as an Inter player on 16 July along with Algerian striker Ishak Belfodil, where he was allocated squad number 9. He said that moving to Inter is a "dream come true", adding that he "had a lot of offers, but wanted only Inter".

He made his unofficial debut one day later during the 3–0 away win against Trentino Select XI by playing in the first half of the 3–0 away win. He scored his first goal for Inter in their 1–1 pre-season friendly draw with Bundesliga club Hamburger SV, netting after less than two minutes on the field and being assisted by Fredy Guarín.

2013–2015: Debut season and Capocannoniere
On 25 August 2013, Icardi made his Inter official debut, coming on as a second-half substitute in a 2–0 home success over Genoa, hitting the crossbar late in the game; he scored his first league goal for the Nerazzurri on 14 September, netting the first of a 1–1 home draw against Juventus, after coming on as a substitute in the 73rd minute.

Due to injury, Icardi missed most of the games of the first part of the season, only returning to first-team matches in February. On 14 February 2014, during the away match against Fiorentina at Stadio Artemio Franchi, Icardi returned in the field after four months and scored the winner after only ten minutes. Later, on 5 April, Icardi scored a brace during the 2–2 home draw against Bologna. That was his first brace of his Inter career. This was followed by another brace during the 0–4 away win against his former side Sampdoria. Before the match, he was booed by the home fans, but he quieted them down by scoring in the 13th minute from a cross from Palacio, making a negative gesture which saw him booked.

On 10 May 2014, in Javier Zanetti's last competitive match at the San Siro, in which Inter defeated Lazio 4–1 to secure a place in Europa League play-off for next season, Icardi scored the second goal of the match in the 37th minute after an assist from Kovačić and went to celebrate with Zanetti. He ended his first season with Nerazzurri with 23 matches in all competitions, including 22 in the league, scoring 9 goals in the process with an average of one goal in every 145 minutes.

On 10 June 2014, Inter and Sampdoria reached the deal to terminate the co-ownership for another €6.5 million, making Inter was the sole employer of Icardi in the football field.

On 20 August 2014, in Inter's first match of the season against Iceland's Stjarnan for first leg of play-off round of the 2014–15 Europa League, Icardi opened a 3–0 away win. That was his first European goal, in his European debut. In the returning leg, he came in as a second-half substitute and scored two times in a 6–0 win at the San Siro, to advance his team into the group stage 9–0 on aggregate.

During the second match of the league season on 14 September, he scored his second Serie A hat-trick in a 7–0 thrashing of Sassuolo. Ten days later, Icardi was injured and substituted in the 24th minute for Dani Osvaldo during the 2–0 home win against Atalanta. On 26 October, Icardi netted his first Serie A goal for over a month, the winner on a penalty kick against Cesena and giving Inter their first away win of the league. He was decisive again three days later, scoring a 90th-minute penalty kick won by Zdravko Kuzmanović in a 1–0 win against Sampdoria, giving his former side their first loss of 2014–15 season.

On 9 November, Icardi scored twice after two assists by Palacio during a 2–2 home draw against Hellas Verona. This draw caused the sacking of coach Walter Mazzarri, who was replaced with the returning Roberto Mancini. On 6 January of the following year, in the first match of the second part of the season, Icardi netted the only goal for his team during the 1–1 draw against Juventus at Juventus Stadium; the goal came in 64th minute after a pass from the Colombian midfielder Fredy Guarín. During that match, he had a conflict with his strike partner Osvaldo who was angry with him after Icardi decided to shoot instead of passing to his teammate who was in a better position to score. Due to this, Osvaldo left the team in the end of January. Five days later, Icardi was decisive in Inter's 3–1 home win against Genoa, scoring the second goal and earlier making an overhead kick (saved by goalkeeper) which was turned into an assist for Palacio.

In the match against Sassuolo, Inter lost 1–3 with Icardi scoring the only goal for his team after a mistake from the Sassuolo defence. After the match, he along with Guarín had a conflict with the fans at the Mapei Stadium. They went to throw their shirt to the fans who refused and threw them back at them, spewing insults at them. On 7 February, Icardi responded by scoring twice in a 3–0 home win against Palermo, refusing to celebrate in the process. After the match Icardi told to the media that the reason he did not celebrate was not the conflict with the fans but failing to find a way to renew his contract with the club directors. He was later criticized by Mancini for not celebrating.

On 11 April, he scored the first goal during the 0–3 away win against Verona, helping Inter get their first win after six consecutive matches. He scored twice on the final day in a 4–3 win over Empoli and finished the season as the joint Serie A top goalscorer with 22 goals with Verona's Luca Toni. Although Inter failed to qualify for European competition for the second time since 1999, Icardi's form attracted attention from abroad, however he signed a new four-year contract at the season's end.

2015–2017: Captaincy and controversy
Before the start of 2015–16 season, it was announced that Icardi would be the new captain of Inter, replacing Andrea Ranocchia who lost his status after a poor 2014–15 season. In his first match as skipper, he was taken off after 15 minutes during the league win against Atalanta; Icardi was substituted for Stevan Jovetić, who scored the winning goal in the third minute of added time. After the examinations, it was announced that Icardi suffered a thigh injury and he missed the following league match against Carpi. He made his comeback on 13 September during the 1–0 home win against the cross-town rivals of Milan and opened his scoring account one week later against Chievo Verona, helping Inter to clinch the 4th consecutive victory. On 27 September, Icardi was again on the scoresheet but this time in a 1–4 defeat versus Fiorentina, who ended Inter's undefeated streak of the 2015–16 season.

One month later, on 28 October, following the 0–1 away win over Bologna where Icardi scored the only goal of the match following an assist from Adem Ljajić, he complained about lack of services to him, accusing his teammates in the process. Icardi told the media that: "In ten matches I've received four chances to score, and I've taken three. I think that is a good average." After that, he was benched for the following league match against Roma, where Inter won, again a 1–0 victory. After the game, coach Mancini said that leaving Icardi on the bench was a "tactical decision", adding that Icardi "must improve his game". He returned to the starting lineup in the next league match against Torino, where Inter grabbed another 1–0 victory.

On 22 November, in his 100th Serie A appearance, he scored in a 4–0 win over the minnows of Frosinone, helping Inter to seal its biggest victory of the season. On 13 December, Icardi netted his first brace of the season, in the 0–4 thrashing of Udinese, benefiting in both occasions from the mistakes of Udinese defenders. In Inter's final match of 2015, Icardi's goal was not enough to avoid the 2–1 home loss against Lazio, but still the team managed to end the year in the first place. At the end of the year, Icardi was ranked the 82nd best footballer in the world by the English newspaper The Guardian.

On 6 January 2016, Icardi finished Ivan Perišić's cross from close range for the only goal away against Empoli, putting Inter on top of Serie A. A month later, on 3 February, he scored his 50th Inter goal in all competitions in a 1–0 home win over Chievo, returning Inter to its winning ways after four consecutive matches. In February 2016, it was reported by several newspapers that Inter had rejected a €30 million bid from Manchester United to sign Icardi. On 9 April, he scored his 50th Serie A goal in a 1–0 away win over Frosinone, making his 100th Inter appearance in the process.

Icardi started the season on 21 August by playing in the 2–0 away defeat to Chievo in the opening league match, and scored his first goal of the season a week later during the 1–1 draw against Palermo at home. On 11 September, Icardi scored both goals, including a last-minute winner, as Inter overturn the score against newly promoted side Pescara for the first win of the season under the new coach Frank de Boer. One week later, in the Derby d'Italia match against Juventus, Icardi scored an equalizer in the 68th minute, and provided the Ivan Perišić goal ten minutes later, as Inter overturn the score again to beat the lifetime rivals for the first time in league since November 2012. It was Icardi's seventh goal in eight appearances against Juventus.

This was followed by a brace in Inter's 2–0 win at Empoli three days later, taking the lead of goalscorers table with six goals in six appearances; it was also the first time that he has scored in four consecutive Serie A matches.

On 7 October, Icardi signed a new contract extension with Inter until June 2021, with a buy-out clause of €110 million. With the new deal, Icardi will earn €4,5 million per season plus various bonuses based on his performances, goals and image rights. Shortly after signing the contract, Icardi stated: "I'm really happy to have signed this new contract that will keep me at the club until 2021. My dream is to win trophies with this team. I heard lots of things during the transfer window, as you always do, but the club was on my side. I have my agent and wife Wanda to thank for this renewal and we're all pleased at home."

Icardi scored a brace to beat Torino 2–1 at the San Siro, giving Inter their first win in their last 5 games. Then, he continued with his outrageous form, scoring back-to-back home braces against Crotone and Fiorentina. In the last match of 2016, Icardi scored another brace against Lazio to help Inter finish the year on a high. He finished the first part of the season with 14 goals and 5 assists, being the most efficient striker in top 5 leagues, overtaking stars such Cristiano Ronaldo and Lionel Messi. The Guardian named him the world's 49th best player, winning 33 positions compared to last year ranking.

On 15 January 2017, in the 3–1 home win against Chievo which was the fifth consecutive win in league, Icardi scored his 15th league goal of the season becoming the first Inter player to score at least 15 goals in three consecutive seasons since Zlatan Ibrahimović and Christian Vieri. On 12 March, he scored a hat-trick against Atalanta, bringing his tally to 20 goals for the season. Icardi amassed 24 league goals in 34 appearances in the 2016–17 season, setting a new personal best. In Europa League, he scored twice in five matches as Inter finished last in Group K.

2017–2019: Second Capocannoniere and departure

Icardi missed much of the pre-season after getting injured in May. He was ready for the start of the season, however, scoring a brace inside 15 minutes in the opening matchday against Fiorentina as Inter won 3–0. He repeated the feat a week later at Roma, as Inter overturned the score to win 3–1, the first league win at Stadio Olimpico after nine years; the goals were Icardi's first at the Olimpico as well. On 10 September, Icardi scored with penalty kick against SPAL to record his 76th Serie A goal for Nerazzurri, entering in Inter's top 10 Serie A goalscorers.

Later on 15 October, Icardi scored all three goals as Inter defeated cross-town rivals Milan 3–2 to put Inter in second place. He became the first player to score a hat-trick in the Derby della Madonnina since Diego Milito in May 2012. Later on throughout the season, on 18 March 2018, Icardi scored four goals, including a 14-minute hat-trick, his 6th in Serie A, against his former club, Sampdoria, to give Inter a 5–0 win at the Stadio Luigi Ferraris. Furthermore, he broke the 100 goal mark in Serie A during the same match, taking his total tally to 103 Serie A goals in his 180th Serie A appearance, becoming the 6th youngest player ever to achieve this feat, at the age of 25 years and 27 days; his fourth goal of the match was also his 100th goal for Inter, in his 172nd appearance for the club.

On 22 April, Icardi scored a tap-in in the 2–1 away win versus Chievo which was his 26th league goal of the season, becoming the first Inter player since Angelillo in the 1958–59 season to achieve the feat. The next week, Icardi scored on Inter's dramatic 2–3 loss to Juventus, marking his 8th goal in 11 appearances against the Turin side.

In the final championship game away versus Lazio, Icardi won and converted a penalty kick to temporally level the score in an eventual 3–2 win. This win placed Inter fourth in championship tied on points with Lazio but ahead on head-to-head points, meaning the club had returned to Champions League for the first time since 2012. With 29 goals, Icardi won the Capocannoniere jointly with Lazio's Ciro Immobile, breaking his previous record of 24 goals set in the previous season; he also become the first Inter player to reach this tally since Antonio Angelillo during the 1958–59 season (33 goals).

Icardi began the new season in slow form, failing to score in the opening six championship matches. He also missed the away game against Bologna due to injury. Icardi played his first match in the UEFA Champions League on 18 September in Inter's opening Group B game against Tottenham Hotspur, netting a late equalizer with a 20-yard volley in an eventual 2–1 home win. His strike was named Champions League Goal of the Week. In the second game away at PSV Eindhoven, Icardi was on the score-sheet again by netting a tap-in after taking the ball around goalkeeper Jeroen Zoet to give Inter a second 2–1 comeback win. By doing so Icardi become the first Inter player since Adriano in 2004–05 season to score in each of his first two Champions League matches.

By scoring a brace in Inter's 2–1 win at SPAL, Icardi reached 103 Serie A goals by matching Christian Vieri tally as the seventh player with the most Serie A goals scored with Inter. In the first game following the international break, Icardi played and scored the game-winner against Milan to make it five league wins in a row for Inter, also scoring the club's 300th goal in the Derby della Madonnina.

Icardi made his 200th Serie A appearance on 24 November by playing in the last 13 minutes of a 3–0 home win over Frosinone. On 13 February 2019, because of several comments that Icardi's wife and agent, Wanda Nara, made about Inter's management and its players on the TV program Tiki Taka, Inter announced that he was to be replaced by Samir Handanović as club captain. In response to being stripped of the captaincy, Icardi refused to play in the club's UEFA Europa League match against Rapid Wien the following day.

He returned in action on 3 April in the league match against Genoa, 53 days since his last appearance; on his return, Icardi scored a penalty after being fouled inside the penalty area by Cristian Romero, who received a straight red card. In the second half, he also set up Ivan Perišić goal before making way for Keita Balde in 80th minute. With this goal, Icardi matched Christian Vieri as Inter's eighth all-time top goalscorer with 123 goals.

In July 2019, it was announced that Icardi would not travel on the club's pre-season tour. On 8 August 2019, the club signed Belgian striker Romelu Lukaku; the following day he was assigned the number 9 shirt that had been worn by Icardi since his arrival in 2013. To avoid potential legal complications, on 20 August Inter assigned Icardi with the number 7 shirt.

Paris Saint-Germain

2019–20: Initial loan and first trophies 

On 2 September 2019, Icardi joined French club Paris Saint-Germain on a one-season loan deal with a €70 million option to buy. He made his debut for PSG off the bench in their 1–0 win against Strasbourg on 14 September. On 1 October, he scored his first goal for the club in a 1–0 away win over Galatasaray, in the UEFA Champions League. On 5 October, he scored his first goal in Ligue 1 in a 4–0 home win over Angers. Icardi scored a brace against rivals Marseille on 27 October in a 4–0 win. He got his first hat-trick for the club on 8 January 2020, in a 6–1 Coupe de la Ligue win over Saint-Étienne.

On 1 May, Icardi won his first club trophy, as PSG were crowned Ligue 1 champions after the season had been called off amid the COVID-19 pandemic; at the time of the league's premature suspension, PSG were in first place, with a twelve–point lead over second–placed Marseille. After the season resumed in the summer, Icardi went onto win the Coupe de France, Coupe de la Ligue, and reached the UEFA Champions League final, in which he remained an unused substitute despite being the team's leading goalscorer in the tournament with 5 goals in 7 games, alongside Kylian Mbappé. On 31 May, Paris Saint-Germain and Inter Milan reached an agreement for Icardi's transfer, worth a reported €60 million. Icardi signed a four-year contract with PSG.

2020–2022: Injury struggles and decline 
Icardi missed the first two matches of the season, which were against Lens and Marseille, due to having tested positive for COVID-19. He made his return to action on 16 September 2020, in a 1–0 win against Metz, and scored his first two goals of the season in a 2–0 win against Reims on 27 September. In October 2020, PSG manager Thomas Tuchel announced that Icardi had suffered an injury to the internal ligament of the knee.

Icardi's return to play came on 28 November, as he came on as a substitute in a 2–2 league draw against Bordeaux. Before the next match against Manchester United, he suffered a setback on his injury, and his time on the sidelines was extended. He had to wait until 9 January 2021 to make his return, coming on as a substitute in a 3–0 win against Brest; he would go on to score a goal himself and assist another for Pablo Sarabia. In the following match, which was against rivals Marseille in the Trophée des Champions, Icardi scored a goal and won a penalty, as PSG were victorious 2–1. He was awarded the man of the match trophy. On 19 May, Icardi opened the scoring for PSG in their 2–0 defeat of Monaco in the 2021 Coupe de France Final.

On 7 August 2021, Icardi scored his first goal of the 2021–22 season in a 2–1 league win over newly-promoted Troyes. On 19 September, he scored the winning goal in stoppage time to hand PSG a 2–1 victory over Lyon. By the end of the season, Icardi had only scored five goals across all competitions, his lowest tally in a campaign since his debut season at Sampdoria.

Loan to Galatasaray 
On 8 September 2022, he signed a 1-year loan contract with Süper Lig team Galatasaray. He made his debut for the Turkish side on 16 September 2022, against Konyaspor. He scored his first goal in a friendly game against Istanbulspor on 24 September 2022.

International career

Youth
In April 2012, Icardi received a call-up from Italy under-19 squad to play in the friendly against England, but the player refused to accept the invitation as he wanted to play for Argentina. His wish was fulfilled on 26 July where he was summoned by Argentina under-20 coach Marcelo Trobbiani to play in the friendly against Germany, in which he made his debut on 14 August at Commerzbank-Arena, and the L'Alcúdia Tournament, held in Valencia, Spain.

Icardi scored his first goal with Argentina U20 on 19 August in a 2–0 win over Japan, which was followed by another two in the 2–1 win against Turkey three days later. The tournament ended in conquest, as Icardi was the top scorer with three goals.

Senior
Following Italy national football team manager Cesare Prandelli's interest in Icardi's performances, in February 2013, Icardi stated his wish to play for the Argentina senior team, despite also being eligible to play for Italy, saying: "I'm very grateful to Italian football for the opportunity it has given me, I'd also like to thank Prandelli for the nice words he expressed about me. But I have to be honest and sincere – I'm Argentine, I feel Argentine, and I've always dreamed of wearing the shirt of my nation. To actually do that would be the maximum for me."

On 15 October 2013, he played his first game for the main squad, coming on as an 82nd-minute substitute for Augusto Fernández in a 2–3 FIFA World Cup qualifier loss away to Uruguay.

In April 2016, Icardi was excluded from Gerardo Martino's preliminary squad for the Copa América Centenario, although the Argentine manager later named him to Argentina's preliminary under-23 squad for the 2016 Summer Olympics in Rio de Janeiro. However, Inter did not release Icardi to participate in the Olympics.

In October 2016, rumours started to speculate in Argentina that Lionel Messi was behind Icardi's exclusion from the national team due to Messi's friendship with Maxi López, Icardi's wife's former partner. The national team coach Edgardo Bauza stated that Icardi's off-field antics have nothing to do with him not being selected for Argentina and he would receive a call-up soon, adding that Messi does not "dictate" the team. However, he was omitted again for the 2018 FIFA World Cup qualification matches against Brazil and Colombia in November.

On 19 May 2017, Icardi received his first call-up after more than three years by newly appointed coach Jorge Sampaoli for the friendlies against Brazil and Singapore in June.

In May 2018, Icardi was named in Argentina's preliminary 35-man squad for the 2018 FIFA World Cup in Russia. Later that month, however, he was left out from the final 23.

Icardi scored his first senior international goal on 20 November 2018, in a 2–0 friendly home win over Mexico. His goal, scored after just 71 seconds, was the fourth quickest goal in Argentina history. In this match, he won the first trophy with the senior team - Copa Adidas 2018.

In May 2019, Icardi was included in Argentina manager Lionel Scaloni's preliminary 40-man squad for the 2019 Copa América. Later that month, however, he was excluded from the final 23-man squad for the tournament.

Style of play

Nicknamed El niño del partido, Icardi is a quick, tactically intelligent, and physically strong striker, with good technique. Known for his excellent attacking movement, positioning, an eye for goal, he mainly operates in central areas inside the penalty box; an accurate and efficient finisher with his head and either foot inside the area, he is known for his ability to score from few touches, although he can also hold up the ball in order to create space or chances for other players, and play off of his teammates. Although he was once criticised for his limited creative and defensive contribution, as well as his lack of significant pace, stamina, power, and movement outside the box, his work-rate has improved in recent seasons, and has seen him drift out to wide positions in order to create space or provide assists for teammates. Long regarded as a talented and promising prospect, in 2013, Don Balón listed him as one of the top 100 young players born after 1992.

Speaking of Icardi, Inter coach Stefano Pioli stated that Icardi "is an animal in the box", and "always finding the right position", while the 1982 FIFA World Cup winner Paolo Rossi described Icardi as a "deadly striker", adding that "even in the most complicated games he can create the right opportunity and take advantage of it." Inter manager Luciano Spalletti called him "a complete striker" adding that "for his age shoulders so much responsibility". In an interview in January 2015, Icardi said his role model is Gabriel Batistuta, but during his time at Barcelona, he added that the forward he mostly resembled was Samuel Eto'o.

Personal life
Icardi is married to Argentine media personality Wanda Nara. Nara was married to Icardi's former Sampdoria teammate Maxi López, but the couple split after her relationship with Icardi was exposed. She and López began divorce proceedings in December 2013. Nara and Icardi subsequently married on 27 May 2014, not long after the divorce was finalised, at a small ceremony in Buenos Aires. They have two daughters, Francesca, born on 19 January 2015, and Isabella, born on 27 October 2016.

The marriage to Wanda provoked animosity against Icardi in Argentina, making him a target of rumors and unsubstantiated claims by Argentinian tabloids. It has been argued that the generalized hatred against him has been an important factor against his being called to the national team, and even prospective calls have been heavily criticized by figures such as the late  Diego Maradona, who had entangled in bitter exchanges with Icardi on Twitter as a result of his marriage to Nara. During an April 2014 Serie A match between Sampdoria and Inter, López notably refused to shake Icardi's hand, leading the press to dub the game the "Wanda derby". Two years later, López repeated the story by again refusing to shake Icardi's hand during a Serie A match against Torino.

Icardi is of partial Italian origin through his paternal ancestors named Icardi from Piedmont and Da Mezan from Venice. He has an Italian passport. He features on the cover of the Italian version of EA Sports' FIFA 16, alongside global cover star and compatriot Lionel Messi. On 6 December 2015, Icardi was robbed of his £29,000 Hublot watch after Inter's 1–0 win over Genoa.

On 11 October 2016, Icardi released his autobiography called Sempre Avanti (Always Forward) published by Sperling & Kupfer. The book caused controversy as Icardi had described an incident which offended certain Inter fans, leading to a banner being displayed calling for Icardi to leave the club. He was fined by the club and was forced to remove such content from the book.

Career statistics

Club

International

As of match played 20 November 2018. Argentina score listed first, score column indicates score after each Icardi goal.

Honours
Paris Saint-Germain
Ligue 1: 2019–20, 2021–22
Coupe de France: 2019–20, 2020–21
Coupe de la Ligue: 2019–20
Trophée des Champions: 2020, 2022
UEFA Champions League runner-up: 2019–20
Individual
Capocannoniere: 2014–15, 2017–18
Serie A Team of the Year: 2014–15, 2017–18
Serie A Goal of the Year: 2018
Serie A Footballer of the Year: 2018
Gazzetta Sports Awards Performance of the Year: 2018

Notes

References

Bibliography
 Paolo Fontanesi, Mauro Icardi, Sempre avanti. La mia storia segreta, Milan, Sperling & Kupfer, 2016,  (Always forward. My secret life).

External links

 
 Inter Milan official profile 
 
 
 
 

1993 births
Living people
Argentine people of Italian descent
Argentine people of Venetian descent
People of Piedmontese descent
Footballers from Rosario, Santa Fe
Argentine footballers
Association football forwards
UD Vecindario players
U.C. Sampdoria players
Inter Milan players
Paris Saint-Germain F.C. players
Galatasaray S.K. footballers
Serie A players
Serie B players
Ligue 1 players
Süper Lig players
Argentina international footballers
Argentine expatriate footballers
Argentine expatriate sportspeople in Spain
Argentine expatriate sportspeople in Italy
Argentine expatriate sportspeople in France
Argentine expatriate sportspeople in Turkey
Expatriate footballers in Spain
Expatriate footballers in Italy
Expatriate footballers in France
Expatriate footballers in Turkey